Mad Love is an American sitcom television series created by Matt Tarses, that aired on CBS from February 14 to May 16, 2011. The sitcom was planned as a mid-season replacement during the 2010–11 television season. On May 15, 2011, Mad Love was cancelled by CBS after one season.

Premise
Kate, Connie, Larry, and Ben are New Yorker thirtysomethings searching for love in the city.  When Kate and Ben meet and fall for each other, their friends remain cynical about the relationship.  Each episode ends with some of the characters in a bar which they frequent, discussing the events of the day.

The cast describes the show as one about two couples falling in love in very different ways.

Cast and characters

Main
Jason Biggs as Ben Parr
Sarah Chalke as Kate Swanson
Judy Greer as Connie Grabowski
Tyler Labine as Larry Munsch

Recurring
Sarah Wright as Tiffany McDermott, a rich trophy wife and Connie's employer.
Martin Starr as Clyde, Connie's creepy neighbor.
Chris Parnell as Dennis Barrett, a state trooper and Connie's short-term boyfriend.

Development and production
In September 2009, creator Matt Tarses received a new pilot commitment from CBS, and the network green-lit the pilot in January 2010 under the original title True Love. Initial casting announcements begin in February. Minka Kelly was the first actor cast, to play the role of Kate. Ashley Austin Morris joined the cast a few days later as Connie, Kate's cousin and best friend.

In March, Jason Biggs committed to the series to portray Ben. Other casting announcements included Hal Williams, who signed on in early March to play Earl, who works in the observation deck of the Empire State Building where Ben and Kate meet. He was expected to narrate the series, but Tyler Labine ultimately performed that function.  Dan Fogler and Sarah Wright were cast a week later.  Fogler was added to portray Larry, who is Ben's best friend, with Wright playing Tiffany, a woman who hires Connie to work as a nanny for her children.

Prior to filming the pilot, there were several casting changes. At the end of March, Fogler was replaced by Tyler Labine, who was originally offered the role of Larry but turned it down. In early April, Lizzy Caplan signed on to replace Morris as Connie. The pilot episode was directed by Pamela Fryman.

More casting changes were announced in June. Sarah Chalke joined the cast in the role of Kate, replacing Kelly.  A few days later, CBS placed a 13-episode series order. The order was contingent on producers finding a replacement for Caplan, who had only agreed to guest star in the pilot. Caplan described filming the Mad Love pilot as a positive experience, but decided that she preferred and wanted to look for work on shows more similar to her previous series, Party Down. Judy Greer came on board in late June to portray Connie, finalizing the series cast.

Episodes

References

External links

2010s American sitcoms
2011 American television series debuts
2011 American television series endings
CBS original programming
English-language television shows
Television series by CBS Studios
Television series by Sony Pictures Television
Television shows set in New York City